Idyla ze staré Prahy ("Old Prague Idyll") is a 1918 Bohemian/Czech romantic drama film, which was directed by architect, producer and amateur director Max Urban. The film was made in 1913 but released in 1918, which was near the end of the World War I and six weeks before the creation of Czechoslovakia.  The film is now lost, so the plot and runtime aren't known. The main role was played by Anna Sedláčková, the director's wife.

In history of Czech cinema, this film is renowned for one other feature: the movie poster (by Josef Wenig, 1918) is the oldest extant poster of Czech origin.

Cast
 Karel Váňa as Gardener
 Anna Sedláčková
 Miloš Vávra
 Lída Sudová
 Zdenka Rydlová-Kvapilová
 Alois Sedláček

Notes

External links
 

1918 drama films
1918 films
Austrian black-and-white films
Hungarian black-and-white films
Austro-Hungarian films
Czech silent films
Hungarian silent films
Hungarian drama films
Czech drama films
Czech black-and-white films
Silent drama films
Lost Czech films